Kimia Hosseini (born 29 July 2003) is an Iranian actress.

Hosseini made her acting debut in 2009 at the age of nine, when she starred as daughter of main characters in Asghar Farhadi's Oscar-winning film A Separation (2011). She won the Silver Bear for Best Actress at the 61st Berlin International Film Festival jointly with Leila Hatami, Sareh Bayat, and Sarina Farhadi as an ensemble for A Separation.

Selected filmography
A Separation (2011)
Amaliyate Mahde Koodak (2012)
Foster Kid (Farzand Khandeh) (2012)
Hello Angels (Salam Bar Fereshtegan) (2012)
Sakene Khane ye Choobi (2012)
The Little Sparrows (Gonjeshkak -e Ashimashi) (2013)
Bodyguard (2016)
Aaadat Nemikonim' (2016)The Last Monday (short, 2017)

Awards
Silver Bear for Best Actress in 61st Berlin Film Festival, Shared with other actresses of A Separation''

References

External links

2003 births
21st-century Iranian actresses
Actresses from Tehran
Iranian child actresses
Iranian female models
Iranian film actresses
Living people
Silver Bear for Best Actress winners